Peter Hunt may refer to:

Peter Hunt (British Army officer) (1916–1988), Chief of the General Staff of the British Army
Peter H. Hunt (1938–2020), American film, television and stage director
Peter R. Hunt (1925–2002), film editor on many early James Bond films and director of On Her Majesty's Secret Service
Peter Hunt (literary critic) (born 1945), scholar of children's literature
Peter Hunt (politician) (born 1966), General Secretary of the British political party, the Co-operative Party
Peter Hunt (darts player) (born 1965), darts player from New Zealand
Peter Hunt (footballer) (born 1952), English footballer
Peter Hunt (folk artist) (1896–1967), American folk artist
Peter John Hunt (1933–1997), British businessman